"Tonight Tonight" is a song by American rock band Hot Chelle Rae. It was released as the lead single from their second album Whatever on March 15, 2011. "Tonight Tonight" was released to mainstream radio on February 22, 2011. It is the band's most commercially successful single, peaking at number seven on the Billboard Hot 100 and being certified double platinum by the Recording Industry Association of America. The single has also sold over 3 million copies as of April 2013.

Composition
"Tonight Tonight" is written in the key of E major, with the vocal range spanning from D♯3 to B4.

Music video
The video features the band performing on a rooftop, as well as attending a kid’s birthday party, where ex-bassist Ian Keaggy is given a tattoo. Nash's brother Chord Overstreet also appears in the video.

Critical reception
"Tonight Tonight" was received well by critics, with Carolyn Giannini of The Sacramento Press saying that it had "summer anthem potential" and Brian Mansfield of USA Today saying it had "the makings of one of the catchiest pop-rock anthems of the summer."

Track listing
Single version
"Tonight Tonight" – 3:20

EP version
"Tonight Tonight" (Radio Disney edit) – 3:20
"Bleed" – 3:53
"I Like to Dance" (MattRad remix) – 3:58
"Let Down" – 2:44

Digital download

"Tonight Tonight" – 3:20
"Tonight Tonight" Goldstein remix – 3:29
"Tonight Tonight Kat Krazy remix – 3:17

Charts

Weekly charts

Year-end charts

Certifications

Release history

See also
 List of Adult Top 40 number-one singles of 2011

References

External links

2011 singles
Hot Chelle Rae songs
2011 songs
Jive Records singles
Songs written by E. Kidd Bogart
Songs written by Emanuel Kiriakou
Songs written by Lindy Robbins